The Kabul–Jalalabad Road, also known as National Highway 08 (NH08), is a highway running between the Afghan cities of Kabul (the national capital) and Jalalabad, the largest city in eastern Afghanistan and capital of Nangarhar Province. A portion of the road runs through the Tang-e Gharu gorge.

Because of the many traffic accidents, the road between Jalalabad and Kabul is considered to be one of the most dangerous in the world. It consists of narrow roads with sharp turns past high cliffs and a valley of the Kabul River below, with which it runs parallel.

It is a large part of the Afghan leg of the Grand Trunk Road.  Parts of the road follow the British Army's disastrous 1842 retreat from Kabul.

See also
Highway 1 (Afghanistan)

References

Roads in Afghanistan
Jalalabad
Kabul
Nangarhar Province
Afghanistan–Soviet Union relations